Magalie Lamarre (born February 24, 1978) is a French former professional tennis player.

A right-handed player, Lamarre reached a career-high ranking of 169 in the world. She twice featured in the French Open singles main draw and won her first-round match in 1997, when Barbara Schett retired hurt while down a set.

ITF finals

Singles (0–2)

Doubles (1–2)

References

External links
 
 

1978 births
Living people
French female tennis players